The 2011–12 Notre Dame Fighting Irish men's basketball team represented the University of Notre Dame in the sport of basketball during the 2011–12 college basketball season.  The Fighting Irish compete in Division I of the National Collegiate Athletic Association (NCAA) and the Big East Conference. They were led by head coach Mike Brey, and played their home games at the Edmund P. Joyce Center Notre Dame, Indiana.

Previous season
The Fighting Irish finished the 2010–11 season 27–7, 14–4 in Big East play, finishing second place behind Pittsburgh. Ben Hansbrough was named Big East Player of the Year, and Mike Brey was named Big East Coach of the Year for the third time. Brey was also named National Coach of the Year by Sports Illustrated & CBSSports.com, and the recipient of the Associated Press College Basketball Coach of the Year award.

The Irish were defeated in the semifinals of the Big East tournament by Louisville. They earned a #2 seed for the NCAA tournament, the program's highest seeding since 1981, where they were eliminated in the third round by Florida State.

Preseason

Roster changes and recruiting
Notre Dame lost team captains Hansbrough & Tyrone Nash to graduation. Additionally, forward Carleton Scott surprised many by declaring for the NBA draft, forgoing his final season of eligibility. All three players went undrafted and signed contracts to play in Europe. 
Notre Dame welcomed one transfer in center Garrick Sherman from Michigan State, who will have two years of eligibility remaining after sitting out the 2011–12 season.

Notre Dame recruited two players from the high school senior class of 2010–11:

Both Katenda and Connaughton were expected to contribute in their freshman season. However, Katenda suffered a "freak injury" to his left eye during a summer pick-up game, leaving him with a permanently damaged optic nerve. The injury, combined with an academic issue with the NCAA, delayed his enrollment at Notre Dame until January 2012. He will sit out the remainder of the season but is expected to play again.

Awards and honors
2nd Team All-Big East – Jack Cooley
Big East Most Improved Player – Jack Cooley
Big East All-Rookie Team – Jerian Grant
Jim Phelan Coach of the Year Award – Mike Brey
NABC District V Coach of the Year – Mike Brey

Roster

 Sherman is not eligible to play under NCAA transfer rules.

Schedule and results
Source
All times are Eastern

|-
!colspan=9| Exhibition

|-
!colspan=9| Regular Season

|-
!colspan=9| Big East Regular Season

|-
!colspan=9| Big East tournament

|-
!colspan=9| NCAA tournament

References

Notre Dame
Notre Dame Fighting Irish men's basketball seasons
Notre Dame
Notre Dame Fighting Irish men's basketball
Notre Dame Fighting Irish men's basketball